Callumn Morrison  (born 5 July 1999) is a Scottish footballer who plays as a forward for Scottish League One club Falkirk. He has also played for Heart of Midlothian and loan spells with Stirling Albion, Brechin City and   East Fife.

Morrison grew up in the Alva area and attended Alva Academy.

Career
Morrison made his league debut for Hearts on 22 August 2015, in a 3–0 win against Partick Thistle. He was loaned to Stirling Albion in the 2016–17 and 2017–18 seasons.

On 26 January 2018, Morrison extended his contract at Hearts until 2020. That same day, he moved on loan to Scottish Championship club Brechin City. He made his debut the following day in a 3–1 defeat against Queen of the South.

On 10 August 2020, Morrison signed for Falkirk, on a one-year deal. 
He signed a further year extension on 20 November 2020.
In his first season at Falkirk, he finished as the clubs top goalscorer scoring nine goals in twenty six games in competitive competitions.

On 19 August 2021, Morrison signed a new two-year deal with Falkirk.

International career
Morrison played for the Scotland under-17 during the 2015–16 season.

Career statistics

References

1999 births
Living people
Scottish footballers
Association football forwards
Heart of Midlothian F.C. players
Stirling Albion F.C. players
Brechin City F.C. players
Scottish Professional Football League players
Scotland youth international footballers
Sportspeople from Clackmannanshire
East Fife F.C. players
Falkirk F.C. players